David Anthony Verity (born 21 September 1949) is an English former footballer who played as a midfielder.

Career
Verity began his career with Scunthorpe United, making 5 appearances in the Football League between 1966 and 1969. He later played for Halifax Town, scoring 5 goals in 78 League appearances over 4 years.

In January 1971 Verity along with three Halifax teammates signed for Drogheda United on loan. He played in the 1971 FAI Cup Final which Drogheda lost after a replay. After leaving Halifax in 1973, Verity played non-League football for Yeovil Town.

Personal life
His brother Kevin was also a professional footballer.

Sources
 DUFC A Claret and Blue History by Brian Whelan (2010)

References

1949 births
Living people
English footballers
Scunthorpe United F.C. players
Halifax Town A.F.C. players
Yeovil Town F.C. players
English Football League players
Drogheda United F.C. players
League of Ireland players
Association football midfielders